The Canadian Screen Award for Best Casting in a Film is an annual award, presented as part of the Canadian Screen Awards program to honour the year's best casting in Canadian theatrical films. It is presented separately from the Canadian Screen Award for Best Casting in a Television Series.

The award was presented for the first time at the 9th Canadian Screen Awards in 2021.

2020s

See also
Prix Iris for Best Casting

References

Casting awards
Casting